Daren Usher (born 7 December 1995) is a Bermudian international footballer who plays for PHC Zebras, as a right back.

Career
Usher has played club football for PHC Zebras. He made his international debut for Bermuda in 2017.

References

1995 births
Living people
Bermudian footballers
Bermuda international footballers
PHC Zebras players
Association football fullbacks